Carolyn Pollan (July 12, 1937 – October 23, 2021) was an American politician. She was a member of the Arkansas House of Representatives representing Fort Smith for 12 terms, from 1975 to 1999, subject to term limits. After that for 3 years she was working with the legislature for Governor Mike Huckabee. She was also vice-chairman of the Arkansas Republican Party and served at various boards and committees.

She earned her PhD in education from Walden University in Minneapolis, Minnesota.

Her honors include "100 Top Women in Arkansas" by Arkansas Business magazine; "One of Ten Outstanding Legislators in the United States Award" by the National Assembly of Government, and the Associated Press Statewide Poll of 100 Influential People in Arkansas. She is a 2020 inductee into the Arkansas Women's Hall of Fame.

Carolyn Pollan was married to George Angelo Pollan for 55 years until his death in 2017. She has three children, Cee Cee, Todd and Rob. Her church affiliation was Baptist. She died on October 23, 2021.

References

 
 
 
 
 
 
 
 

 

1937 births
2021 deaths
Businesspeople from Arkansas
Baptists from Texas
Springdale High School alumni
John Brown University alumni
Republican Party members of the Arkansas House of Representatives
Politicians from Houston
Politicians from Fort Smith, Arkansas
Women state legislators in Arkansas
Baptists from Arkansas
Educators from Texas
American women educators
21st-century American women